Coral Coast is the stretch of coastline between Sigatoka and Suva, on the island of Viti Levu, in Fiji.

This stretch of coast is one of Fiji's tourist areas with resorts located in various locations along the coast and on islands just off the coast. The riverside town of Sigatoka is the centre of tourism for the Coral Coast. It is home to many hotels and resorts with plenty of things to do. From the beach life to trying great foods, there is also a chance to get a real, authentic experience in Fiji. Villagers welcome tourists to experience their day by day life such as, fishing and selling at the local market.

References

Landforms of Fiji
Viti Levu
Coasts of Oceania